Peoria is an unincorporated community in Springfield Township, Franklin County, Indiana.

History
Peoria was named after the Peoria tribe. A post office was established at Peoria in 1850, and remained in operation until it was discontinued in 1907.

Peoria once had the Ingleside Institute academy and a normal school.

Geography
Peoria is located on the state line.

References

Unincorporated communities in Franklin County, Indiana
Unincorporated communities in Indiana